Booneville is the name of some places in the United States:

Booneville, Arkansas
Booneville, Iowa
Booneville, Kentucky
Booneville, Mississippi
Booneville, Missouri
Booneville, Tennessee
Booneville, New York
Booneville Channel (Oregon), a Benton County, Oregon channel to the Willamette River

See also
 Boonville (disambiguation)